Senecio bigelovii or nodding groundsel or nodding ragwort is a perennial herb native to the Colorado Plateau region of the United States.

References

External links
USDA Plants Profile for Senecio bigelovii (nodding ragwort)

bigelovi
Flora of Arizona
Flora of Colorado
Flora of Nevada
Flora of New Mexico
Flora of Utah
Flora of Wyoming
Flora of the Colorado Plateau and Canyonlands region
Flora without expected TNC conservation status